Curling at the 2017 Winter Universiade was held from January 30 to February 7 at the Almaty Arena in Almaty, Kazakhstan.

Medal summary

Medal table

Medalists

Men

Teams 

(source:)

Round-robin standings 
Final Round Robin Standings

Round-robin results 
All draw times are listed in (UTC+6).

Draw 1 
Monday, January 30, 14:00

Draw 2 
Tuesday, January 31, 9:00

Draw 3 
Tuesday, January 31, 19:00

Draw 4 
Wednesday, February 1, 14:00

Draw 5 
Thursday, February 2, 9:00

Draw 6 
Thursday, February 2, 19:00

Draw 7 
Friday, February 3, 14:00

Draw 8 
Saturday, February 4, 9:00

Draw 9 
Saturday, February 4, 19:00

Playoffs

Semifinals 

Monday, February 6, 9:00

Bronze Medal Game 

Monday, February 6, 16:00

Gold Medal Game 

Tuesday, February 7, 14:00

Final standings

Women

Teams 

(sources:)

Round-robin standings 
Final Round Robin Standings

Round-robin results

Draw 1 
Monday, January 30, 9:00

Draw 2 
Monday, January 30, 19:00

Draw 3 
Tuesday, January 31, 14:00

Draw 4 
Wednesday, February 1, 9:00

Draw 5 
Wednesday, February 1, 19:00

Draw 6 
Thursday, February 2, 14:00

Draw 7 
Friday, February 3, 9:00

Draw 8 
Friday, February 3, 19:00

Draw 9 
Saturday, February 4, 14:00

Tiebreaker 
Sunday, February 5, 9:00

Playoffs

Semifinals 

Monday, February 6, 9:00

Bronze Medal Game 

Monday, February 6, 16:00

Gold Medal Game 

Tuesday, February 7, 9:00

Final standings

References

External links

Website at the World Curling Federation
 Technical Handbook — Curling — Almaty 2017
 Men's tournament at the World Curling Federation
 Women's tournament at the World Curling Federation
 World Curling Federation — Curling set for Kazakhstan return at Winter Universiade
 Detailed schedule — Curling — 28th Winter Universiade — FISU
 Athletes — Curling — 28th Winter Universiade — FISU
 World Curling Federation — 28th Winter Universiade Live Scores
Results book

Curling
Winter Universiade
2017
Winter Universiade 2017